The 1903 Georgetown Blue and Gray football team represented Georgetown University during the 1903 college football season. Led by Philip King in his first year as head coach, the team went 7–3 and claims a Southern championship. National champion Princeton's two closest game were against Yale and Georgetown. Captain Hub Hart had a 99-yard run from scrimmage against Maryland; this is still a school record.

Schedule

Players

Line

Backfield

References

Georgetown
Georgetown Hoyas football seasons
Georgetown Blue and Gray football